Anna Ballbona i Puig (Montmeló, 1980) is a Spanish journalist, writer and literary critic. She usually collaborates on media such as El PuntAvui, El 9 Nou, El 9 Esportiu i Núvol. She studied Journalism, Literary theory and Comparative literature. In 2008 she was awarded the Premi Amadeu Oller for her first book of poems, La mare que et renyava era un robot. In 2016 she was one of the first writers to use the Faber Residency.

Published work 
 La mare que et renyava era un robot, Galerada, 2002
 Quàntiques!: 10 poetes joves en diferencial femení, Universitat Autònoma de Barcelona, 2008 [collective work]
 Conill de gàbia, Labreu edicions, 2012
 Joyce i les gallines, Anagrama, 2016
 No soc aquí (Anagrama, 2020)

Awards 
 2008 — Premi Amadeu Oller
 2009 — Premi Salvador Reynaldos of Journalism
2020 — Anagrama Award for Catalan novels.

References

External links 
 Writer's Blog

Journalists from Catalonia
Writers from Catalonia
1980 births
Living people
People from Vallès Oriental